John Rochester may refer to:
John Rochester (martyr) (c. 1498–1537), English Catholic priest 
John Rochester (politician) (1822–1894), Canadian industrialist and politician
John Wilmot, 2nd Earl of Rochester (1647–1680)

See also
John Fisher, Bishop of Rochester